Robert Pagan (November 16, 1750 – November 23, 1821) was a Scottish-born merchant, judge and political figure in New Brunswick. He represented Charlotte County in the Legislative Assembly of New Brunswick from 1786 to 1819.

He was born in Glasgow, the son of William Pagan and Margaret Maxwell. In 1768 or 1769, he went to Falmouth Neck, Massachusetts (now Portland, Maine), where he became involved in the timber trade and ship building. He married Miriam Pote.  His brother Thomas joined him in 1775. In October 1775, his premises were destroyed by American forces who were reacting to rebel activity in the area. The two brothers departed to the West Indies. They returned in 1777, joining their brother William in New York City. Pagan was named in the Massachusetts Banishment Act of 1778. In 1780, Pagan settled at the mouth of the Penobscot River, believing that this would become a loyalist settlement, and established sawmills, stores and engaged in ship building. In 1783, learning that the border would be established further east, he relocated to Passamaquoddy Bay. He was named a justice of the peace for the area and was later named a judge of the Inferior Court of Common Pleas for the county. The community there was named St. Andrews in 1786. Pagan was involved in the timber trade, operating mills, shipbuilding and the fish trade and was a wholesale and retail merchant. He assisted in research and surveys which helped establish the St. Croix River as the international boundary with Maine. Pagan helped found the Bank of New Brunswick in 1820. He died in St Andrews the following year at the age of 71.

External links 
Biography at the Dictionary of Canadian Biography Online

1750 births
1821 deaths
Members of the Legislative Assembly of New Brunswick
Scottish emigrants to pre-Confederation New Brunswick
Colony of New Brunswick judges